Navana Akter is a Bangladesh Awami League politician and the former Member of Bangladesh Parliament from a reserved seat.

Early life
Akter was born on 9 February 1975. She was a practicing lawyer before joining politics.

Career
Akter was elected to parliament from reserved seat as a Bangladesh Awami League candidate in 2014.

References

Awami League politicians
Living people
1975 births
Women members of the Jatiya Sangsad
10th Jatiya Sangsad members
21st-century Bangladeshi women politicians
21st-century Bangladeshi politicians